Evert Johan Kroon (born 9 December 1966) is a swimmer who represented the Netherlands Antilles. He competed in three events at the 1984 Summer Olympics.

References

External links
 

1966 births
Living people
Dutch Antillean male swimmers
Olympic swimmers of the Netherlands Antilles
Swimmers at the 1984 Summer Olympics
Place of birth missing (living people)